Upright position may refer to:
 Upright position (electronics), a signal upconverted to the multiplexer band without inverting the frequencies
 an upright position

See also
 Erect (disambiguation)